The second season of the American television mystery music game show I Can See Your Voice premiered on Fox on January 5, 2022, following a holiday special that aired on December 14, 2021.

Gameplay

Format
Under the original format, the contestant can eliminate one or two mystery singers after each round. The game concludes with the last mystery singer standing which depends on the outcome of a duet performance with a guest artist.

Rewards
The contestant must eliminate one mystery singer at the end of each of first five rounds, receiving  if they eliminate a bad singer.

Rounds
Each episode presents the guest artist and contestant with six people whose identities and singing voices are kept concealed until they are eliminated to perform on the "stage of truth" or remain in the end to perform the final duet.

Episodes

Guest artists

Panelists

Reception

Television ratings

Notes

References

I Can See Your Voice (American game show)
2022 American television seasons